The soccer club FC Edmonton competed in the North American Soccer League in the American pyramid from the team’s founding in 2011 through the league’s demise in 2017. After a year on hiatus, Edmonton played in the Canadian Premier League from 2019 until 2022. The following list is inclusive of all competitive yearly records for the club.

Key
Key to competitions

 Canadian Premier League (CPL) – The top-flight of soccer in Canada, established in 2019.
 North American Soccer League (NASL) – The second division of soccer in the United States from 2011 through 2017, now defunct.
 Canadian Championship (CC) – The premier knockout cup competition in Canadian soccer, first contested in 2008.

Key to colors and symbols

Key to league record
 Div = Level in league system
 Pld = Played
 W = Games won
 L = Games lost
 D = Games drawn
 GF = Goals scored
 GA = Goals against
 Pts = Points
 PPG = Points per game
 Pos. = League position

Key to cup record
 DNQ = Did not qualify
 NH = Competition not held or canceled
 QR = Qualifying round
 R2 = Second round
 QF = Quarterfinals
 SF = Semifinals
 RU = Runners-up
 W = Winners

Seasons

1. Average attendance include statistics from league matches only.
2. Top goalscorer(s) includes all goals scored in league, league playoffs, Canadian Championship, CONCACAF League, and other competitive continental matches.

References

External links

 
FC Edmonton